The 1922 Australasian Championships was a tennis tournament that took place on outdoor Grass courts at the White City Tennis Club, Sydney, Australia from 2 December to 9 December. It was the 15th edition of the Australian Championships (now known as the Australian Open), the third held in Sydney, and the third Grand Slam tournament of the year. It was the inaugural year for the women's singles, women's doubles and mixed doubles competitions. The singles titles were won by Australians James Anderson and Margaret Molesworth.

Finals

Men's singles

 James Anderson defeated  Gerald Patterson  6–0, 3–6, 3–6, 6–3, 6–2

Women's singles

 Margaret Molesworth defeated  Esna Boyd  6–3, 10–8

Men's doubles
 Jack Hawkes /  Gerald Patterson defeated  James Anderson /  Norman Peach 8–10, 6–0, 6–0, 7–5

Women's doubles
 Esna Boyd Robertson /  Marjorie Mountain defeated  Floris St. George /  Gwen Utz 1–6, 6–4, 7–5

Mixed doubles
 Esna Boyd Robertson /  Jack Hawkes defeated  Gwen Utz /  Harold Utz 6–1, 6–1

External links
 Australian Open official website

 
1922 in Australian tennis
1922
December 1922 sports events